The name Donatus can refer to the following people:

People
 One of several saints named Donatus
 Aelius Donatus, a Roman grammarian and teacher of rhetoric
 Donatus Magnus, a 4th-century bishop of Carthage and leader of the Donatist sect of Christianity
 Donatus (d. 412), a representative of the Huns, possibly their king or just an ambassador; or a Roman living among the Huns
 Donatus (5th century), a monk who left Roman Africa during one of the Vandal persecutions and established monastic life in Valencia, Spain
 Donatus (bishop of Killala), fl. 1244
 Tiberius Claudius Donatus, a Roman grammarian known for his commentary on the Aeneid

Places
 St. Donatus, Iowa, a community in the United States
 Saint Donatus Catholic Church, a parish of the Roman Catholic Church located in St. Donatus, Iowa

See also
 Donato (disambiguation)
 San Donato (disambiguation)

pl:Donat (imię)